Tutto il mondo ride is a 1952 Italian film.

Description 
The film is an anthology of old comedies of the silent and sound era of comedy films of the early 1900s. Laurel and Hardy also take part in quato mounting film and short film credits are taken from their filmography: Come Clean and Helpmates; with the original Italian dubbing of Mauro Zambuto (Laurel) and Alberto Sordi (Hardy).

Cast

External links
 

1952 films
1950s Italian-language films
Italian comedy films
1952 comedy films
Italian black-and-white films
1950s Italian films